American indie rock band Yeah Yeah Yeahs have released five studio albums, one compilation album, four extended plays, 15 singles, two video albums, and 15 music videos. The band formed in New York City in 2000, and consists of lead singer Karen O, drummer Brian Chase, and guitarist Nick Zinner.

The band released their self-titled debut EP in July 2001. It was followed by another EP a year later, titled Machine, which spawned an identically titled single that peaked at number 37 on the UK Singles Chart. The band's debut studio album, Fever to Tell, was released in April 2003,  reaching number 55 on the US Billboard 200 chart and number 13 on the UK Albums Chart. Fever to Tell spawned four singles, including "Maps", which also charted in the US and UK.

Yeah Yeah Yeahs' second album, Show Your Bones, was released in March 2006, followed a year later by another EP, Is Is. The band has also released one video album, Tell Me What Rockers to Swallow, which features footage from a live performance and all of the band's music videos through 2004. Yeah Yeah Yeahs released their third studio album, It's Blitz!, in April 2009. The band's fourth album, Mosquito, was released in April 2013 and became their highest-peaking album in the US to date, reaching number five on the Billboard 200.

Albums

Studio albums

Compilation albums

Extended plays

Singles

Other charting songs

Videography

Video releases

Music videos

Notes

References

External links
 
 
 
 

Alternative rock discographies
Discographies of American artists
Rock music group discographies
Discography